Sayyed Ahmad Alavi, also known as Ahmad  b. Zayn al-'Abidin al-'Abidin al-'Alawi al-'Amili, or Mir Sayyid Ahmad 'Alavi 'Amili, (d. between 1644 - 1650) was a Safavid philosopher and theologian of the Philosophical school of isfahan.

Life and education
Little is known about his life. His ancestors were residents of Aleppo and his father also sojourned there for a long time. His father migrated to Safavid Iran as part of the large-scale immigration of the Shia Levantine Ulama to Iran that had been going on ever since the reign of king Ismail I (r. 1501—1524). His family sojourned in Isfahan. Sayyed Ahmad himself was born in Isfahan, and received education under the supervision of Mir Damad and Shaykh Bahai. He was counted as one of the eminent pupils of Mir Damad's school of thought. He also had a family relationship with Mir Damad as he was his son-in-law and cousin. He was familiar with Hebrew language in order to deal with the texts of the Old Testament and New Testament.

Works
Nearly fifty works are attributed to him in which the commentary of Qabasat (amounting up to 700 pages) is one of them. He wrote the commentary by the direct order of Mir Damad. He also has written a book by the name of "Izha Al Haq" as the earliest essay against Abu Muslim. Although Sayyed Ahmad followed the ways of his teacher, he simultaneously tried to show his dominance on other predecessors such as Farabi and Fakhr Al Din Samaki. Some other books written by him are:
 Miftah Al Shefa (i.e. Miftāḥ al-shifāʼ, the keys of healing) as a commentary on Avicenna's The book of healing
 Masqal Al Safa (i.e. Miṣqal-i ṣafāʼ) as a response to christian missionary
 Lataef Al Qeybah (i.e. Laṭāʼif-i ghaybah'')

Death
He died between 1644 and 1650. He was buried in Takht Foolad, near the Agha Razi's Takiyyah.

See also
 Philosophical school of isfahan

References

Sources
 

Aristotelian philosophers
Islamic philosophers
17th-century Iranian philosophers
17th-century deaths